The 2017–18 Hartford Hawks men's basketball team  represented the University of Hartford during the 2017–18 NCAA Division I men's basketball season. The Hawks, led by eighth-year head coach John Gallagher, played their home games at the Chase Arena at Reich Family Pavilion as members of the America East Conference.They finished the season 19–14, 11–5 in America East play to finish in third place. They defeated New Hampshire in the quarterfinals of the America East tournament before losing to UMBC in the semifinals. They received an invitation to the CollegeInsider.com Tournament where they lost in the first round to San Diego.

Previous season
The Hawks finished the season 9–22, 4–12 in America East play to finish in seventh place. They lost in the quarterfinals of the America East tournament to Albany.

Offseason

Departures

2017 incoming recruits

Roster

Schedule and results

|-
!colspan=9 style=| Non-conference regular season

|-
!colspan=9 style=| America East regular season

|-
!colspan=9 style=| America East tournament

|-
!colspan=9 style=| CIT

References

Hartford Hawks men's basketball seasons
Hartford
Hartford Hawks men's b
Hartford Hawks men's b
Hartford